Ethylmethylamine, or N-methylethanamine, is a compound with the chemical formula C3H9N. It is corrosive and highly flammable.

References 

Alkylamines
Secondary amines